Anne-Marie Belinda Trevelyan (née Beaton; born 6 April 1969) is a British politician serving as Minister of State for Indo-Pacific since October 2022.  A member of the Conservative Party, she has been Member of Parliament (MP) for Berwick-upon-Tweed since 2015. She previously served in the Cabinets of Boris Johnson and Liz Truss as Secretary of State for International Development from February to September 2020, Secretary of State for International Trade and President of the Board of Trade from 2021 to 2022, and Secretary of State for Transport from September to October 2022. As well as serving in Secretary of State positions, Trevelyan has also served in the junior minister positions of Minister of State for Business, Energy and Clean Growth in 2021, Minister of State for the Armed Forces between 2019 and 2020, and Parliamentary Under-Secretary of State for Defence Procurement in 2019.

Early life and career
Trevelyan was born in London on 6 April 1969, the daughter of Donald Leonard and Katherine (née Bougarel) Beaton. Trevelyan was privately educated at St Paul's Girls' School, Hammersmith. She subsequently studied at Oxford Polytechnic.

She qualified as a chartered accountant in London with Price Waterhouse (a predecessor firm of PricewaterhouseCoopers) and worked in PwC's corporate finance department before moving to Northumberland in 1996. She is a former Governor of Northumbria Healthcare Trust and of Berwick Academy. Reports prepared by Trevelyan's "Dual the A1 Campaign" were submitted to the consultation to make the road a dual carriageway.

She unsuccessfully stood as the Conservative candidate in the Morpeth North ward of Castle Morpeth Borough Council in 1999. She subsequently stood as the Conservative candidate in the Hartburn ward of Castle Morpeth Borough Council in 2003, but failed to get elected.

Trevelyan unsuccessfully stood in the 2010 general election as the Conservative candidate for Berwick-upon-Tweed, achieving a swing from the Liberal Democrats to Conservatives of 8.3%. In so doing, she reduced Sir Alan Beith's majority from 8,632 to 2,690.

Parliamentary career

Backbencher 
At the 2015 general election, Trevelyan was elected as the MP for Berwick-upon-Tweed, gaining the seat for the Conservatives with a 9.6% swing, after the sitting MP Sir Alan Beith stood down. She was re-elected with an increased majority in the 2017 general election.

In June 2015, Trevelyan was appointed Vice-Chairman of the newly created All-Party Parliamentary Group on Forestry. In Parliament, Trevelyan served on the Public Accounts Select Committee between July 2015 and May 2017.

In November 2015, she was appointed to the Parliamentary Assembly of the Organization for Security and Co-operation in Europe. On 27 October 2016 during Prime Minister's Questions the then-Prime Minister Theresa May praised Trevelyan for her work on the Armed Forces Covenant. In January 2018, Trevelyan was appointed as Parliamentary Private Secretary to Gavin Williamson in the Ministry of Defence.

An outspoken Eurosceptic, Trevelyan resigned as a Parliamentary Private Secretary in November 2018 over her disagreement with Theresa May's draft Brexit withdrawal agreement.

In November 2018, Trevelyan referred Labour shadow minister Kate Osamor to the Parliamentary Commissioner for Standards, on the grounds that Osamor's behaviour "failed to uphold" the code of conduct for MPs, after Osamor continued to employ her son Haringey Councillor, Ishmael Osamor, as a senior communications adviser, despite her son pleading guilty to possession of drugs valued at £2,500. Osamor denied any wrongdoing and called the referral "politically motivated".

Ministerial positions

Minister of State for Defence Procurement 
On 27 July 2019, Trevelyan was appointed Parliamentary Under-Secretary of State for Defence Procurement in the first Johnson ministry.

Minister of State for the Armed Forces 
She was promoted to Minister of State for the Armed Forces on 16 December 2019. As Minister of State for the Armed Forces, she met with the United States Secretary of the Army Ryan D. McCarthy at The Pentagon on 11 February 2020.

Secretary of State for International Development 
On 13 February 2020, Trevelyan was promoted to Secretary of State for International Development during the first cabinet reshuffle of the second Johnson ministry. Prior to her appointment, Trevelyan expressed apparent scepticism about the value of foreign aid on a number of occasions.

In May 2020 the Labour MP and first British female MP of Chinese descent Sarah Owen accused Trevelyan of Sinophobia after Trevelyan posted a WhatsApp message of a picture of a split fortune cookie, saying in broken English "You not have coronavirus", captioned "Just received my Covid-19 rapid test kit from China. Soooooo relieved!", with a follow-up message of "Just for Bob" and a winking emoji referring to Conservative MP Bob Seely, who responded by sending a love heart and smiling emoji. Owen said: "If Anne-Marie Trevelyan doesn't understand why this sort of humour was left in the 1970s, I would be happy to explain it to her." Seely responded to Owen by saying "It was a well-meaning joke at my expense and I didn't think anything of it", referring to his campaign against the Chinese tech company Huawei. Trevelyan responded to Owen by saying "It was not my intent to cause any offence, and I am truly sorry if I did so".

After the Beirut explosion of 4 August 2020, the UK government, through Trevelyan's Secretary of International Development Department, aid-funded the UK Emergency Medical Team (UK EMT) were sent to help. The UK also gave £5m in emergency support, £3m of it for the British Red Cross. As International Development Secretary, Trevelyan represented the UK at a donor event hosted by UN secretary general António Guterres and French president Emmanuel Macron.

Due to the COVID-19 pandemic, in August 2020 Trevelyan set up the Vulnerable Supply Chains Facility, its funding being £4.85 million from UK aid and £2 million from businesses. The premise was that the Department for International Development, UK supermarket and fashion businesses such as Morrisons, Tesco, Marks & Spencer and Primark, and charities such as Care UK, The Fairtrade Foundation and the Ethical Trading Initiative, work together to improve working conditions and support access to healthcare and health information for workers in developing countries, with a focus on countries such as Myanmar, Bangladesh, Kenya, Uganda, Ethiopia, Tanzania, Rwanda and Ghana.

Trevelyan's department was merged with the Foreign and Commonwealth Office on 2 September 2020, when Foreign Secretary Dominic Raab assumed responsibility for a new department, named the Foreign, Commonwealth and Development Office. This made her the last Secretary of State for International Development. Following the merger, Trevelyan left the government.

Minister of State for Business, Energy and Clean Growth 
Trevelyan returned to the backbench between September 2020 and January 2021 during which time on 7 November 2020, Trevelyan was appointed the UK International Champion on Adaptation and Resilience for the COP26 Presidency. However on 8 January 2021, Trevelyan returned to government after being appointed Minister of State for Business, Energy and Clean Growth at the Department for Business, Energy and Industrial Strategy.

Secretary of State for International Trade 
On 15 September 2021, Trevelyan was appointed Secretary of State for International Trade during the second cabinet reshuffle of the second Johnson ministry.

In November 2021 The Independent Parliamentary Standards Authority (IPSA) revealed Trevelyan's accommodation expenses were £136,590.26 on a flat in London since she was elected in 2015, despite the fact she had already had a flat in London which she does not use. The criticism of her accommodation expenses were part of the parliamentary second jobs controversy following Owen Patterson's resignation from Parliament.

During the second jobs controversy Trevelyan supported MPs having second jobs outside parliament, however on different radio shows commented different hours a week a MP should be allowed to work outside parliament. On Times Radio she said they should be allowed to work 8 to 10 hours a week,  on BBC Breakfast 10 or 15 hours a week,  and on BBC Radio 4 10 to 20 hours a week. Her comment to BBC Breakfast was ridiculed on the current affairs panel show Have I Got New For You, "I think the question of MPs having jobs that involve lobbying perhaps should be looked at again. But, across the board, I don’t think we should have a removal of the ability to maintain a second job, because it brings a richness to our role as members of parliament."

Trevelyan supported Prime Minister Boris Johnson during the Westminster lockdown parties controversy. After Boris Johnson's resignation, on 7 July 2022, launched the July 2022 Conservative Party leadership election, she supported Tom Tugendhat, and was his proposer for his candidacy. After he was knocked out in the 3rd ballot on 19 July she endorsed Foreign Secretary Liz Truss., who won the election on the 5th September,  againist former Chancellor Rishi Sunak, getting 57.4% of the member's vote to Sunak's 42.6%.

Secretary of State for Transport 
On 6 September 2022, Trevelyan was appointed Secretary of State for Transport during the formation of the Truss ministry.

On 21 September 2022, she also assumed responsibility for shipping and aviation, previously handled by the Under-Secretary of State for Transport Robert Courts. She is the first modern Secretary of State for Transport to assume responsibility for shipping directly, as this responsibility has traditionally been delegated to a junior minister.

After Liz Truss's resignation on 20 October 2022 Trevelyan endorsed former Prime Minister Boris Johnson in the resulting Conservative Party leadership election, after Johnson stated he would not run for a second term Trevelyan did not endorse anyone else for the leadership. Rishi Sunak went on to win the election unopposed on the 24 October 2022  after Penny Mordaunt withdrew from the election.

Minister of State for Indo-Pacific 
On 25 October 2022 Trevelyan was dismissed as Secretary of State for Transport by Rishi Sunak upon his ascension to Prime Minister, being replaced by Mark Harper.  On 26 October 2022, Trevelyan was appointed as Minister of State for Indo-Pacific. Her appointment was reported as a demotion by various media outlets due to her support for Liz Truss in the July–September leadership election, against Rishi Sunak.

Political stances

Euroscepticism 
In June 2015, Trevelyan joined the Conservatives for Britain group, a Eurosceptic group within the Conservative Party which subsequently moved closer to outright opposition to British membership of the European Union. She later joined the European Research Group – the primary Eurosceptic lobbying group within Parliament. Trevelyan advocated a vote in favour of Brexit for the 2016 EU membership referendum.

In March 2018, she attended a protest in London organised by the Fishing for Leave group against proposed access to British waters for EU fisherman up to 2021. The event included the UKIP MEP Nigel Farage. The Independent reported that Trevelyan faced calls for her sacking as a ministerial aide for attending the event in defiance of an order from Conservative whips for party MPs not to take part. On 15 November 2018, Trevelyan resigned from her post as a Parliamentary Private Secretary over Theresa May's draft EU withdrawal agreement.

Environmental 
Trevelyan has campaigned for reducing plastic packaging. In 2005, she opposed the ban on fox hunting. She supports fracking, including voting in 2016 in support of fracking under Northumberland National Park,  and voting against Labour's motion to ban fracking for shale gas in October 2022. Between 2010 and 2012 Trevelyan wrote a series of incorrect tweets denying global warming, including stating "[there is] clear evidence that the ice caps aren't melting after all" and "global warming isn't actually happening".

Armed Forces 
Trevelyan is a member of the Armed Forces Parliamentary Scheme and campaigns to improve mental health services for veterans in Northumberland.

Local issues 
In 2015 Trevelyan secured the support of life sciences minister George Freeman for pharmaceutical company Covance which had a site in her constituency.

Trevelyan campaigned for dualling the A1 road. In 2007 she set the Dual the A1 campaign group to raise government awareness. In 2014 then-Prime Minister David Cameron announced an initial £290 million investment to upgrade the road.

Trevelyan has campaigned for improving rural broadband. She has also campaigned for reopening the Harbottle Surgery.

In September 2020 she commented on the rejection of the opening of an open cast mine at Druridge Bay, a seven-mile stretch of Northumberland Coast from the seaport town of Amble to the village of Cresswell:

Political campaign finances

Alleged overspending 
In May 2016, it was reported that Trevelyan was one of a number of Conservative MPs being investigated by police in the 2015 general election party spending investigation, for allegedly spending more than the legal limit on constituency election campaign expenses. In May 2017, the Crown Prosecution Service said that while there was evidence of inaccurate spending returns, it did not "meet the test" for further action.

Donations from Alexander Temerko 
In April 2018, Trevelyan was criticised by the Alnwick Labour Party in the wake of the Poisoning of Sergei and Yulia Skripal over claims that a Russian businessman gave almost £50,000 to fund her 2015 general election campaign. The Labour Party questioned why the Conservative Party was accepting large donations from such sources. Trevelyan stated that the man in question was now a naturalised British citizen born in Ukraine who had invested significantly in the region, while she had personally not received any funds from Alexander Temerko, with funds going to the Berwick-upon-Tweed Conservative Association, with Trevelyan commenting "as is his right as a British citzen".

Temerko was born in the Ukrainian Soviet Socialist Republic (present-day Ukraine, then a part of the Soviet Union). He fled to London shortly after he was examined by criminal investigators in October 2004.

Trevelyan's connections with Temerko caused her to step down a from Government project that involved him. In 2021, Temerko was responsible for a project to establish a cross-channel power cable to provide a electricity link between England's south coast and Normandy in France, and so Trevelyan recused herself from the project, Labour MP Catherine West said that Trevelyan "quite rightly recused herself". Fellow Conservative MP Alok Sharma also recused himself, leaving then Business Secretary Kwasi Kwarteng responsible for the decision making.

Personal life 

Trevelyan lives in London and Northumberland. She is divorced with two teenage children, in October 2017, she said that one of her teenage sons might not have voted for her if he had been old enough to vote. She previously lived in Netherwitton Hall, a Grade II listed country house near Morpeth with her former husband John Trevelyan, owner of the Netherwitton Hall Estates.

She took part in the Singing for Syrians concert at Westminster in December 2017.

References

External links 
 
 
 
 Dual the A1 campaign group website

|-

|-

1969 births
21st-century British women politicians
Alumni of Oxford Brookes University
Conservative Party (UK) MPs for English constituencies
English accountants
Female members of the Cabinet of the United Kingdom
Female members of the Parliament of the United Kingdom for English constituencies
Living people
People educated at St Paul's Girls' School
People from Morpeth, Northumberland
PricewaterhouseCoopers people
Presidents of the Board of Trade
Secretaries of State for Transport (UK)
UK MPs 2015–2017
UK MPs 2017–2019
UK MPs 2019–present
British Eurosceptics
21st-century English women
21st-century English people